Robert Christie (June 29, 1826 – March 9, 1914) was an Ontario businessman and political figure. He represented Wentworth North in the Legislative Assembly of Ontario as a Liberal member from 1867 to 1874.

He served as vice-president of the Canadian Mutual Fire Insurance Company and was a director of the Canada West Farmer's Mutual and Stock Insurance Company. He later was named Inspector of Asylums and Prisons. He died in 1914. He was the last surviving member of the first Ontario legislature at the time of his death.

References

External links 

The Canadian parliamentary companion and annual register, 1873, HJ Morgan

1826 births
1914 deaths
Ontario Liberal Party MPPs
People from Orkney